Nobody Walks is a 2012 American independent drama film directed by Ry Russo-Young. The film premiered in Competition at the 2012 Sundance Film Festival and won a special Jury Prize.

The film stars John Krasinski, Olivia Thirlby, Rosemarie DeWitt, India Ennenga, Jane Levy and Justin Kirk, and was co-written by Russo-Young and Lena Dunham.

Magnolia Pictures released the film on VOD September 6, 2012 and in theaters October 12, 2012.

Plot 
 
23-year-old Martine (Olivia Thirlby) has just arrived in the Silver Lake area of Los Angeles when she moves into a wealthy family's pool house, and begins working to complete her art film. Meanwhile, Peter (John Krasinski), a laid-back father of two, agrees to his wife's request to help their young guest complete the project. The more time Martine spends with her surrogate family, the more apparent it becomes no one will walk away from this situation unchanged.

Reception
Rotten Tomatoes gives the film a score of 41% based on 41 reviews, with an average rating of 5.19/10.

References

External links
 
 
 

2012 drama films
2012 films
Adultery in films
American drama films
American independent films
Films about filmmaking
Films produced by Jonathan Schwartz
Films set in Los Angeles
Films produced by Andrea Sperling
2012 independent films
2010s English-language films
2010s American films